State Route 187 (SR 187) is a primary state highway in the U.S. state of Virginia. The state highway runs  from SR 658 at Guilford east to SR 679 in Modest Town. SR 187 connects U.S. Route 13 (US 13) with Bloxom in northern Accomack County.

Route description

SR 187 begins at an intersection with SR 658 (Winterville Road) in the village of Guilford. The state highway heads east as two-lane undivided Guilford Road to the town of Bloxom. SR 187 veers north along Shore Main Drive, then heads east again to intersect the northern end of SR 316 (Bayside Drive) and cross an inactive railroad line. The state highway curves north again, then veers east and follows Nelsonia Road through Macedonia to Nelsonia, where the highway meets US 13 (Lankford Highway). Before entering Modest Town, SR 187 reaches SR 679 (Metompkin Road) a short distance southwest of the community. SR 187 turns left onto Metompkin Road and passes through Modest Town before the designation ends just northeast of the community. SR 679 continues north as Metompkin Road.

Major intersections

References

External links

Virginia Highways Project: VA 187

187
State Route 187